Stade Municipal is a multi-use stadium in Dschang, Cameroon. It is currently used mostly for football matches. It serves as a home ground of Aigle Royal Menoua. The stadium holds 5,000 people.

Football venues in Cameroon